Tallinn Cathedral School (also Tallinn Knight and Cathedral School; ,) is a school in Tallinn, Estonia.

First written records of the school date back to 1319. In 1684, the school was destroyed in the large fire in the Toompea area. The construction of a new school building was completed seven years larter, in 1691. Since 1765, the school was managed by Estonian Knighthood. The construction of the building at Toom-Kooli Street 11 where the school located nowadays, was completed in 1845. In 1892, the school was closed due to Russification. In 1906, the school was re-opened. In 1920, Estonian Knighthood was liquidated and the school was managed by the successor organization of knighthood. School was closed during World War II in the context of Baltic German Umsiedlung.

Since 1965, the school building is used by Tallinn Ballet School.

References

External links
 

Schools in Tallinn
Tallinn Old Town